Now is the third studio album by South Korean girl group Fin.K.L, released through DSP Media on October 6, 2000. The album spawned two singles that were promoted with live performances on music programs: the title track "Now" and "Feel Your Love".

Reception 
The album experienced commercial success in South Korea, where it peaked at number 2 on the monthly MIAK album chart for October 2000 with initial sales of 386,329 copies. The album sold over 412,000 copies by the end of 2000, making it the 19th best-selling album of the year and the fourth best-selling album by a female artist in South Korea during 2000. Fin.K.L won several awards with Now, including Album Bonsang at the annual Golden Disc Awards and Best Female Group at the 2000 Mnet Music Video Festival.

Promotion and live performances 
On October 8, 2000, Fin.K.L made their comeback stage on SBS's Inkigayo, where they performed "Eternal Love", "Feel Your Love", and "Now". They received their first music show win for "Now" on KBS's Music Bank on November 2. At the 2000 Mnet Music Video Festival, they performed "Eternal Love" and "Now".

Covers 
On April 4, 2009, Wonder Girls released a remake of "Now" along with an accompanying music video, which served as a CF for KT Tech's mobile phone brand Ever.

Accolades

Tracklist

Charts and sales

Monthly charts

Yearly charts

Sales

References 

2000 albums